San Pedro y San Pablo Tequixtepec is a town and municipality in Oaxaca in south-western Mexico. The municipality covers an area of  km². 
Having the longest place name in Mexico (28 letters), it is part of the Huajuapan District in the north of the Mixteca Region.

As of 2005, the municipality had a total population of 1,878.

References

Municipalities of Oaxaca